The Calabozoidae are a family of freshwater isopod crustaceans in suborder Calabozoidea (or Calabozoida). It comprises two genera, Calabazoa and Pongycarcina.

References

External links

Isopoda
Crustacean families